The Price of Honor is a 1927 American silent crime film directed by Edward H. Griffith and starring Dorothy Revier, Malcolm McGregor and Gustav von Seyffertitz.

Cast
 Dorothy Revier as Carolyn McLane 
 Malcolm McGregor as Anthony Fielding 
 William V. Mong as Daniel B. Joyt 
 Gustav von Seyffertitz as Peter Fielding 
 Erville Alderson as Ogden Bennett 
 Dan Mason as Roberts

References

Bibliography
 Langman, Larry. American Film Cycles: The Silent Era. Greenwood Publishing, 1998.

External links

1927 films
1927 crime films
American crime films
Films directed by Edward H. Griffith
American silent feature films
1920s English-language films
American black-and-white films
Columbia Pictures films
1920s American films